Caravan to Vaccarès is a 1974 British-French action film directed by Geoffrey Reeve and starring David Birney, Charlotte Rampling and Michael Lonsdale. It was loosely based on the 1970 novel Caravan to Vaccarès by Alistair MacLean.

Plot
In the south of France, a mysterious assassin shoots one man, then another.

A wandering young American adventurer, Bowman (David Birney), meets a pretty young British photographer, Lila (Charlotte Rampling) when she hitches a ride. They run into the assassin while helping a couple who have broken down by the side of the road.

When they arrive in town they meet a French duke (Michel Lonsdale) who invites them to dinner. David reveals that the duke had met him in Paris and offered him a job for $3,000 and a return ticket to New York but he doesn't know what for. He is driving a car lent by the duke. That night a man breaks into a place where they are staying but Bowman fights him off.

The duke appears and hires Bowman to smuggle a Hungarian scientist (Michael Bryan) out of France to the United States. Bowman is reluctant but the duke says if he won't do it he will report the car as being stolen.

The scientist escaped the Iron Curtain by hiding with a caravan of gypsies, but is being pursued by an unscrupulous gang bent on capturing him for sale to the highest bidder.

A woman who helps Bowman is murdered at a bull fight. She turns out to be the Duc's daughter.

Lila and the scientist are kidnapped, but Borman rescues them. Lila and Bowman sleep together.

Bowman is driving the scientist to safety in a car when a helicopter chases after them. The helicopter drives the car off the road. It seems the scientist has fallen into quicksand; a rope is dropped from the helicopter to retrieve him. However it turns out the man is Bowman in disguise. He overpowers one of the men in the helicopter then is dropped into a bull ring. Bowman defeats a bull fighter and is about to be killed by a charging bull but is rescued when the Duc shoots it dead.

The Duc farewells Bowman and Lila at the airport with the scientist.

Cast
 David Birney as Bowman 
 Charlotte Rampling as Lila 
 Michael Lonsdale as Duc de Croyter
 Marcel Bozzuffi as Czerda 
 Michael Bryant as Zuger 
 Serge Marquand as Ferenc 
 Marianne Eggerickx as Cecile 
 Françoise Brion as Stella 
 Vania Vilers as Vania 
 Manitas De Plata as Ricardo 
 Jean-Pierre Cargol as Jules 
 Jean-Pierre Castaldi as Pierre 
 Jean Michaux as Waiter 
 Alan Scott as Receptionist 
 Jean-Yves Gautier as Gendarme
 Graham Hill as Helicopter pilot

Production
The story was originally written as a screenplay before being turned into a novel.

The film was shot on location in the Camargue. The finale, where David Birney is dropped into a bull ring from a helicopter, was filmed last.

Reception
The film had a royal premiere at the Odeon in Leicester Square honour of the Save the Children Fund. It was attended by Princess Anne and her then-husband Mark Phillips, but not MacLean who refused to attend.

Critique
The Guardian praised Rampling's beauty but said Birney "is about as expressive as a constipated owl" and that the film had "rather plastic romance and enough cinematic action to fill half a bucket with stuntmen's sweat."

References

External links

Review at Variety.com

Review at Time Out London
Review at AlistairMacLean.com
Review at New York Times

1974 films
1970s action thriller films
1970s spy films
Films based on British novels
Films based on works by Alistair MacLean
Films directed by Geoffrey Reeve
Films set in France
British action films 
French action films 
French spy films
British spy films
Cold War spy films
Films scored by Stanley Myers
English-language French films
1970s English-language films
1970s British films
1970s French films